The Australian Film Institute Award for Best Children's Television Drama is awarded annually by the Australian Film Institute as part of the awards in television for excellence in children's drama. The award commenced in 1991 and in 2009 an additional category for Best Children's Television Animation was awarded.

Best Children's Television Drama

See also
 Australian Film Institute
 AFI Awards
 Australian Film Institute Television Awards

References

C
Children's television awards